Robert Wade may refer to:

Robert Wade (born 1962), half of the British screenwriting duo Neal Purvis and Robert Wade
Robert Wade (chess player) (1921–2008), New Zealand and British chess player
Robert Wade (cricketer) (born 1968), English cricketer
Robert Wade (scholar) (born 1944), New Zealand development scholar
Robert Wade (surgeon) (1798–1872), British surgeon
Robert Wade (watercolour artist) (born 1930), Australian artist
Robert E. Wade (born 1933), Canadian politician
Robert F. Wade (20th century), Knights of Columbus executive

See also 

 Bob Wade (artist) (1943–2019), American artist; born Robert Schrope Wade
 Bob Wade (basketball) (born 1944), American football player and basketball coach; born Robert Pernell Wade
 Bobby Wade (born 1981), professional American football wide receiver; born Robert Louis Wade, Jr.
 Whit Masterson (1920–2012), American author/screenwriter; born Robert Allison Wade
 John Wade (American football) (born 1975), American NFL football player; Robert John Wade